Kumbia Queers is Argentine tropical-punk band, originally from Buenos Aires, Argentina in 2007.

History 
The project was born in Buenos Aires in 2007, the union of She Devils, Juana Chang and Florencia Lliteras (Happy Makers), (Argentina), with Ali Gua Gua of Las Ultrasónicas (México). At first, they played covers of The Cure, Madonna, Ramones, Black Sabbath, twisting them to the rhythm of cumbia with lyrics full of queer poetry and humor. With their third album, 2012 appeared, the group turned to their own songs and lyrics mainly.

In summer 2012, the band went on their third tour in Europe. Within 27 days they played at 23 locations from Stockholm to Madrid in a total of 25 concerts. 2014 was the band in Latin America and - at the invitation of the jury of the SXSW Festival - traveling in the United States. In summer 2015, the Kumbia Queers returned to Europe and performed with a new lineup, without Ali Gua Gua.

Each year, the Kumbia Queers make over one hundred appearances. The number of fans is growing, especially in Chile, Mexico, Canada, Spain. Japan and Argentina.

Discography 
 2007: Kumbia nena!
 2010: La gran estafa del tropipunk
 2012: Pecados Tropicales
 2015: Canta y no llores
2019: La Oscuridad Bailable

See also 
Argentine punk
Queercore
Cumbia villera

References

External links 

Kumbia Queers web site

All-female punk bands
Argentine rock music groups
Argentine punk rock groups
Cumbia musical groups
LGBT culture in Buenos Aires
Argentine LGBT musicians
Musical groups established in 2007
Queercore groups
LGBT people in Latin music
2007 establishments in Argentina